The Roswitha Prize is the oldest German language prize for literature that is given solely to women.

The Roswitha-Medal has been given almost yearly since 1973 by the city of Bad Gandersheim. 
In 1998 it received its modern designation along with an endowment of €5,500. It is named for Roswitha of Gandersheim, a 10th-century Benedictine nun who is considered the first female German playwright and author.

List of Recipients

1973 Marie-Luise Kaschnitz
1974 Hilde Domin
1975 Ilse Aichinger
1976 Elisabeth Borchers
1977 Dagmar Nick
1978 Elfriede Jelinek
1979 Luise Rinser
1980 Rose Ausländer
1981 Hilde Spiel
1982 Friederike Mayröcker
1983 Sarah Kirsch
1984 Greta Schoon
1985 Irmtraud Morgner
1986 Ulla Hahn
1987 Irina Korschunow
1988 Gerlind Reinshagen
1989 Helga M. Novak
1990 Herta Müller
1991 No Award
1992 Helga Königsdorf
1993 Christa Reinig
1994 Monika Maron
1995 Libuse Monikova
1996 Gisela von Wysocki
1997 No Award
1998 Carola Stern
1999 Birgit Vanderbeke
2000 Silvia Bovenschen
2001 Erika Fuchs
2002 Katja Lange-Müller
2003 Antje Rávic Strubel
2004 Angelika Klüssendorf
2005 Julia Franck
2006 Ruth Klüger
2007 Felicitas Hoppe
2008 Cornelia Funke
2009 No Award
2010 Anna Katharina Hahn
2011 Olga Martynova
2012 Elke Erb
2013 Ulrike Draesner
2014 Gertrud Leutenegger
2015 
2016 Nora Bossong
2017 Petra Morsbach
2018 Terézia Mora
2019 Monika Rinck
2020 Ulrike Almut Sandig
2021 Emine Sevgi Özdamar
2022

See also
 German literature
 List of literary awards honoring women
 List of literary awards
 List of poetry awards
 List of years in literature
 List of years in poetry

References

External links
 

German literary awards
Literary awards honoring women
Awards established in 1973
1973 establishments in Germany